Statistics of the Primera Fuerza for the 1919–20 season.

Liga Nacional

Overview
It was contested by 9 teams, and Club España won the championship.

Centro Union switched their name to America.

League Standings

Top goalscorers
Players sorted first by goals scored, then by last name.

Liga Mexicana

Overview
Pachuca won the championship.

References
Mexico - List of final tables (RSSSF)

Primera Fuerza seasons
Mex
1919–20 in Mexican football